State Highway 327 (SH 327)  is a  state highway in the U.S. state of Texas.  The highway begins at a junction with U.S. Highway 69 (US 69) and US 287 south of Kountze and heads east to a junction with U.S. Highway 96 in Silsbee.

History
SH 327 was designated on February 13, 1940 to serve as a route from US 69 south of Kountze to Silsbee. On February 23, 1956 the highway was extended to the east to the new location of US 96.

Route description
SH 327 begins  in East Texas at a junction with US 69 and US 287.  It intersects US 96 Bus. in Silsbee.  SH 327 reaches its eastern terminus at US 96 in Silsbee.

Junction list

References

327
Transportation in Hardin County, Texas